Victoria Lye-Hua Chan-Palay (born 9 October 1945) is a Singaporean-born neuroscientist who has worked in the United States and Switzerland.

Early life and education
Chan is the second daughter of noted Singaporean swimming coach Dr. Chan Ah Kow. Among her four brothers and two sisters is Patricia Chan, who represented Singapore in swimming at the Southeast Asian Games in the 1960s and 1970s. As a young woman, Chan excelled at school in science, and herself represented Singapore in international swimming competitions as well. 

She left Singapore in 1962 with a scholarship to Smith College, from which she graduated in 1965. She then went on to the Tufts University School of Medicine for a Ph.D., which she completed in 1969. While living in the Greater Boston area, she met Sanford Palay, and married him in 1970. She graduated from Harvard Medical School in 1975 as the first woman to receive an M.D. summa cum laude.

Chan-Palay had two daughters Vicky and Rebecca, the latter with her husband Sanford Palay. However, their marriage ended in divorce.

Scientific career
Chan-Palay did seminal research in neuroscience with her husband in the 1970s. She would go on to found the journal Dementia and Geriatric Cognitive Disorders. She was named a White House Fellow and an assistant to Secretary of Defense Harold Brown in 1979, making her one of the first Singaporeans to achieve such a high rank in the United States government. 

She later moved to Switzerland, where she served as part of the faculty of University of Zurich Medical School from 1989. She was awarded the Humboldt Prize in Medical Research by the Alexander von Humboldt Foundation. She relinquished her United States citizenship in 2012.

Works

Notes

References

1945 births
Living people
Singaporean sportswomen
Singaporean emigrants to the United States
People who renounced United States citizenship
Harvard Medical School alumni
Smith College alumni
Tufts University School of Medicine alumni
Academic staff of the University of Zurich
Swiss neuroscientists
Swiss women neuroscientists
Swiss people of Singaporean descent
Singaporean expatriates in Switzerland
White House Fellows